Menez or Ménez is a surname, and may refer to;

Menez means mount or mountain in Breton.

 Maria Inês Ribeiro da Fonseca a.k.a. Menez - Portuguese painter
 Jérémy Ménez - French international footballer
 André Menez - French biologist
 Bénédicte Menez - French geomicrobiologist
 Bernard Menez - French actor
 Conner Menez - American baseball player
 François Ménez - French writer and journalist
 Bruno Menais a.k.a. Yann Menez - French writer
 Yves Ménez a.k.a. Pier Min (1905 – 1983) - Breton accordionist

Breton-language surnames